The 1998 Indian general election in Jammu and Kashmir to the 12th Lok Sabha were held for 6 seats. Jammu and Kashmir National Conference won 3 seats, Bharatiya Janata Party won 2 seats and Indian National Congress won 1 seat.

Constituency Details

Results

Party-wise Results

List of Elected MPs

See also 

 Results of the 2004 Indian general election by state

References 

1998
1998
Jammu